Mads Lind (born 7 July 1980) is a retired Danish handballer, who played for Danish Handball League side Aarhus GF and Århus Håndbold. He played for the club since its founding in 2001 until the new professional merger that founded the new Århus Håndbold club.

Mads was captain for Århus Håndbold until he retired from professional handball in 2015.

In 2002, Lind was issued a two-year ban from handball after testing positive for the use of anabolic steroids. It was the first doping case in Danish handball.

References

External links
https://www.fyens.dk/sport/AArhus-Haandbold-mister-sin-anfoerer/artikel/2620517

1980 births
Living people
Danish male handball players
Danish sportspeople in doping cases
Sportspeople from Aarhus